The Rhodesian White People's Party (RWPP) was a Rhodesian neo-Nazi political party led by James Kenneth "Ken" Rodger. The movement was founded in Bulawayo on 30 January 1976, it mainly inspired the American Nazi Party and later with it the National Socialist White People's Party. It was outlawed in November 1976 by the government of Ian Smith for anti-Semitic incidents by US citizens who were members of the party against the Bulawayo Hebrew Congregation. Among the expelled citizens were the neo-Nazis Eric Thompson and Harold Covington. The Rhodesian government said: "We have problems enough without this nutcase". This political party was the only one of the World Union of National Socialists that was active in Africa. His main activity was distributing Nazi literature and harassing Jews in the area.The political party was founded at a meeting in Bulawayo, 30 January 1976, by 30 former members of the Rhodesian Front. Among its founders were the British Kenneth Rodger and Eric Thompson (aka Eric Campbell), the French Jean-Pierre Marechaux, and the American Harold Covington. It was founded with the aim of opposing communism.

The party was opposed to the government of Ian Smith for his allegedly Zionist policies and supposed defeatism in the Rhodesian Bush War, and he was considered by the party to be the country's greatest enemy, instead of the ZANU guerrillas who were fighting against the government in Rhodesia.

References 

Political parties disestablished in 1979
Banned far-right parties
Neo-Nazi political parties
Neo-Nazism in Africa
Defunct political parties in Zimbabwe
Political parties in Rhodesia